Elisa Cansino (b.1895) was a vaudeville and Spanish dancer, and one of The Dancing Cansinos. She was the daughter of Antonio Cansino and aunt of Rita Hayworth. Elisa played a major part in bringing Spanish and Romani dances to the United States. Elisa Cansino is of Romani descent through her father's line.

Early life 
Elisa was born in Seville, Andalusia, Spain. 

Her parents were dancers, Antonio Cansino and Carmen Cansino. 

Elisa and Eduardo Cansino toured the B. F. Keith Circuit circa 1910 in the United States. Then, she taught dance in Spain. Later, she danced in New York City with her brothers Eduardo and Angel in The Dancing Cansinos.  

She married Nathaniel A Jackolo and had a daughter named Gabriel Cansino.

Career 
She was an actress, known for Hubby's Quiet Little Game (1926) and Masked Mamas (1926).

References 

1895 births
Year of death missing
People from Seville
Flamenco dancers
20th-century Spanish dancers
Spanish female dancers
Vaudeville performers
Spanish people of Romani descent
Cansino family
Spanish expatriates in the United States